Ashford Reservoir is a small reservoir on the eastern side of the Quantock Hills near the villages of Charlynch and Spaxton in Somerset, England. 
It was constructed 1934 as a water supply reservoir for Bridgwater.

Originally the reservoir was contained by a small embankment dam.
In 2009 the banks were removed and replaced by a concrete wall that could contain  of water.
The reservoir collects the water of Peart Water which is also dammed at Hawkridge Reservoir.
Below the reservoir the Peart Water joins the Currypool stream to form the Cannington Brook.
Fishing is allowed and catches include; Bream, Perch and Roach.
The water treatment centre provides educational opportunities.

References

External links
Spaxton at British History Online

Drinking water reservoirs in England
Reservoirs in Somerset